Lieutenant General Ronnie Shikapwasha (born December 25, 1947) is the former Minister of Information and Broadcasting Services of Zambia.

Political career 
He held that post from 2008 until his party, the Movement for Multi-Party Democracy (MMD,) lost the elections to the Patriotic Front in September 2011. A retired Lt General of the Zambia Air Force, he was previously the home affairs minister of Zambia, from February 9, 2003, until January 2005, when he switched positions with Kalombo Mwansa in a cabinet reshuffle and became foreign minister. He served as foreign minister for nearly two years, until another cabinet reshuffle in October 2006 which occurred after Levy Mwanawasa’s election to a second term as president. Shikapwasha returned to the position of home affairs minister and was replaced as foreign minister by agriculture minister Mundia Sikatana. Shikapwasha hails from Zambia's Central Province and is believed to be a relative to the former First Lady of Zambia, Maureen Kakubo Mwanawasa.

Military career 
Before becoming Air Force Commander in 1991, Shikapwasha served as a diplomat and defence attache to Tanzania but fell out of favour with former president Kenneth Kaunda. During his tenure, former president Kaunda had the General investigated and found no wrongdoings. It is believed that he was sent back to Zambia where he was supposed to face charges but there was nothing to charge him on.

Shikapwasha served as the Zambia Air Force Commander under former president Frederick Chiluba. He was subsequently relieved from his duties while lying in a hospital in South Africa on the verge of death.

Personal life 
His education of that of military background, having attended training in England, Russia, China, former Yugoslavia, and India. He is world travelled and once served as the first republican president (KK) personal pilot. He has 8 children with his wife Jane. Gen Shikapwasha is a staunch Christian.

References 

1947 births
Information and Broadcasting Services ministers of Zambia
Home Affairs ministers of Zambia
Foreign Ministers of Zambia
Living people
Zambian military personnel
Air force generals